The Westside Union School District in Southern California serves the western parts of Palmdale and Lancaster  and their immediate suburbs, including Quartz Hill, Del Sur, Leona Valley, Antelope Acres, and Neenach.

It enrolls transitional kindergarten through eighth grade. High school education (ninth through 12th grades) is provided by the Antelope Valley Union High School District.

Schools operated by the district

As of December 1 2018, the district has approximately 9,600 students enrolled in 13 schools: 
 6 Transitional Kindergarten - Sixth Grade schools
 2 Transitional Kindergarten - Eighth Grade schools
 2 Kindergarten - Sixth Grade schools
3 Sixth Grade - Eighth Grade schools

Elementary
Cottonwood Elementary School, Palmdale
Esperanza Elementary School, Palmdale
Gregg Anderson Academy
Quartz Hill Elementary School, Quartz Hill
Rancho Vista Elementary School, Palmdale
Sundown Elementary School, Quartz Hill
Valley View Elementary School, West Lancaster/ Borderline Quartz Hill

Middle
Hillview Middle School, Palmdale
Joe Walker Middle School, Quartz Hill
Westside Academy, Quartz Hill

Combined elementary and middle
Anaverde Hills School, Palmdale
Del Sur School, Antelope Acres
Leona Valley School, Leona Valley

See also
List of school districts in California
Palmdale School District
Lancaster School District
Keppel Union School District
Eastside Union School District

References

External links
 

Education in Palmdale, California
Education in Lancaster, California
School districts in Los Angeles County, California